David Kaetau Havili (born 23 December 1994) is a New Zealand rugby union player who currently plays as a fullback, centre or first five-eighth for  in the Bunnings NPC and the  in the Super Rugby competition.

Early career
Havili is of Pākeha and Tongan descent and is the son of former Nelson Bays rugby representative Bill Havili. David Havili was born in Nelson in the South Island of New Zealand, but raised in nearby Motueka. He initially attended Motueka High School, but later went to Nelson College, where he was a member of their top side. After finishing school he began working as a builder's apprentice while playing local club rugby for Nelson. During this time, he made his way through 's youth structures and was a member of the  Knights Development team.

Senior career

Tasman
He played all 11 games for the Mako in their run to the semi finals in 2015, scoring 31 points in the process. Tasman were again losing finalists in 2016 with Havili playing a key role with two tries in 10 games. During the 2019 season Havili captained Tasman to their first Mitre 10 Cup premiership title, scoring a try in the final win over Wellington. Havili again captained the Mako to their second premiership title in a row in 2020.

Super Rugby
As a result of his impressive displays in his debut season at provincial level, Havili was named as a member of the Crusaders wider training group for the 2015 Super Rugby season. Somewhat surprisingly, he featured 11 times in his first season in Christchurch and helped himself to two tries which saw him promoted to the full squad for 2016. In October 2016, it was announced that he had signed a new three-year deal which would see him stay with the Crusaders through to the end of the 2019 season.

Havili started at second five-eighth against the touring British and Irish Lions in 2017, slotting into the place of the injured Ryan Crotty. Havili played the full 80 minutes as the Crusaders lost to the Lions 3–12.

In the 2017 Super Rugby season, Havili was a key member of the Crusaders squad that lost only one match on the way to their eighth Super Rugby title. Havili was one of the Crusaders stand out performers in the 2017 season, not only displacing All Blacks 60-plus test veteran Israel Dagg from the fullback position, causing Dagg to be shifted to the right wing upon his return from a knee injury, but was also voted the Crusaders Player of the Year for 2017. Havili was one of the leading try scorers of the 2017 Super Rugby season, finishing with eight tries. Winger Seta Tamanivalu was the only Crusader to score more tries than Havili, scoring 10.

Havili again played a crucial part in the Crusaders title wins in 2018 and 2019.

International
Havili was a member of the New Zealand Under-20 side that finished third in the 2014 IRB Junior World Championship in his home country. He was not named in the initial squad, but was later called up to replace the injured Simon Hickey.

Havili was called up to the All Blacks for the 2017 Rugby Championship squad after shoulder surgery ruled out Hurricanes back Jordie Barrett for the rest of the year.

Havili made his All Blacks debut against the Pumas on 1 October 2017 at José Amalfitani Stadium in Buenos Aires, replacing in-form winger Rieko Ioane with only 10 minutes left of the match. Despite only 10 minutes of game time Havili scored a try in the last minute of the test, allowing the All Blacks to beat Los Pumas 39–22. His standout performance against Argentina saw him named on the bench the following week against South Africa where he replaced the injured Nehe Milner-Skudder shortly before half time. Havili was the best performing substitute off the bench in that fixture, setting up Damian McKenzie's try to make the score a 25–24 win over the Springboks for New Zealand.

Havili played in three games on the 2017 end of year tour, the first of which was a quiet performance in a 23–18 loss to the Wallabies where he replaced Lima Sopoaga off the bench. Havili earned his first start for the All Blacks on 5 November 2017 in a 31–22 win over the Barbarians where he was replaced by Sopoaga in the 46th minute. Havili also started for the All Blacks ten days later in a 28–23 win over a French side where he produced a good performance and was not subbed off.

Havili was not part of the side in 2018, 2019 and 2020 but after an outstanding season playing in the midfield for the  during the 2021 Super Rugby season he was named in the All Blacks squad to play Tonga and Fiji in the July Steinlager Series. He made his return against Fiji at Forsyth Barr Stadium, starting in the number 12 jersey in a 57–23 win for the All Blacks. He had a mixed game, scoring two brilliant tries but later being yellow carded.

International tries

References

External links
 

1994 births
Living people
Barbarian F.C. players
Crusaders (rugby union) players
New Zealand international rugby union players
New Zealand rugby union players
People educated at Motueka High School
People educated at Nelson College
Rugby union centres
Rugby union fly-halves
Rugby union fullbacks
Rugby union players from Nelson, New Zealand
Tasman rugby union players